Tadeusz Foryś (born 31 October 1910 – 6 March 1987) was a football player and manager.

Career
Foryś spent his playing career with Warszawianka.

After his playing career, he went into coaching and management. In total he was assistant manager of Poland eight times, and the Polish first team manager twice. In the league he managed Polonia Warsaw, Gwardia Warsaw, Lechia Gdańsk, Arka Gdynia, ŁKS Łódź, Odra Opole, GKS Katowice, Ruch Chorzów, and Bałtyk Gdynia.

In 1983 he became an honorary member of the PZPN (Polish Football association).

Personal life
His father, Walenty Foryś, was the president of the Polish Athletic Association. His brother, Czesław Foryś, was an athlete who competed for Poland in the 1928 Summer Olympics as a 1500m runner. He was the vice president of the Polish Athletic Association from 1949–65, and became an honorary president for the association in 1965.

References

1910 births
1987 deaths
Polish footballers
Footballers from Kraków
Polish football managers
Odra Opole managers
GKS Katowice managers
Arka Gdynia managers
ŁKS Łódź managers
Ruch Chorzów managers
Lechia Gdańsk managers
Poland national football team managers
Association footballers not categorized by position